The black-headed kingfisher (Actenoides monachus capucinus) is a kingfisher  in the subfamily Halcyoninae that is endemic to the eastern and southern regions of Sulawesi in Indonesia. It can be found in dense lowland forests up to  elevation. It is threatened by habitat destruction by deforestation.

The black-headed kingfisher is considered as a subspecies of the green-backed kingfisher (Actenoides monachus) by the International Ornithologists' Union but some taxonomists elevate the taxon to species status.

References

black-headed kingfisher
Endemic birds of Sulawesi
black-headed kingfisher